Claudie Gallay (born 1961) is a French writer. In parallel to her work as a writer, she works part-time as a teacher.

Bibliography 
 2001: L'Office des vivants, 
 2002: Mon amour, ma vie, Éditions du Rouergue, 
 2004: Seule Venise, Éditions du Rouergue, Prix d'Ambronay 2004,  - Cezam Prix Littéraire Inter CE - 2004
 2004:Les Années cerises, Éditions du Rouergue, 
 2006: Dans l'or du temps, Éditions du Rouergue, 
 2008: Les Déferlantes, Éditions du Rouergue, 
- Prix des lecteurs de la Ville de Brive-la-Gaillarde 2008.- Prix Culture et Bibliothèques pour tous (CBPT) 2009.- Grand prix des lectrices de Elle 2009.- Prix Livre & Mer Henri-Queffélec 2009.- Prix des Lecteurs du Télégramme - Prix Jean-Pierre Coudurier 2009.- Prix Rosine Perrier 2009.
- Prix Littéraire de la Ville de Caen 2009.
 2010: L’Amour est une île, Actes Sud, 
 2013: Une part de ciel, Actes Sud, 
 2014: Détails d’Opalka, Actes Sud, 

Participation
 La Rencontre, collective, short story collection, Éditions Prisma, 2010. Participation along Marek Halter, Camilla Läckberg, Didier Van Cauwelaert, Éliette Abécassis and Agnès Desarthe.

Preface

Adaptation 
 TV
With Sylvie Testud and Bruno Todeschini. (aired on Arte 22 November 2013).

Prizes and awards 
 In October 2014, she received the Grand Prix of the City of Saint-Etienne for Détails d’Opalka.

References

External links 
 Claudie Gallay on Babelio
 Claudie Gallay  on Actes Sud
 Claudie Gallay: Une part de ciel on Le Figaro (18 September 2013)
 Claudie Gallay : les mystères de la Hague on Le Monde (3 July 2008)
 Les livres de Claudie Gallay  on Le Choix des libraires
 Claudie Gallay - Une part de ciel on YouTube
 Claudie Gallay on France Culture

1961 births
People from Bourgoin-Jallieu
21st-century French non-fiction writers
French women novelists
Living people
21st-century French women writers